Hendrik Pieter Koekkoek (13 January 1843, Hilversum - year unknown, England) was a Dutch landscape painter. He signed his paintings "H. P. Koekkoek", but is usually referred to as Pieter Hendrik.  His year of death is known to have been after 1890. Some sources indicate it was before 1910, but a few place it as late as 1927.

Life and work
He was a member of the famous ; son of the landscape painter, Marinus Adrianus Koekkoek. His three uncles and paternal grandfather were all painters.

His father gave him his first art lessons. At the beginning, in the 1860s and 1870s, he painted in the same style as his father; Realism with Romantic elements. His subject matter was mostly forests and rivers. Later, his works were entirely Realistic. He had a reputation for a love of nature that went beyond mere professional interest.

He worked throughout the Netherlands; alternating his base between Amsterdam and The Hague. He also made long, frequent trips to London, where his cousin, Hermanus (known as "The Younger"), owned an art dealership. Much of his work was sold in England. The last verified reference to him is in the Amsterdam City Register for June, 1889.

Sources 
 Brief biography @ Simonis & Buunk
 Benno Tempel, Ronald de Leeuw: Het Romantiek Boek. Waanders Uitgevers, Zwolle, 2006. 
 Grarda Hermina Marius, Geraldine Norman: Dutch painters of the 19th century. Antique Collectors' Club, 1973. pg.267

External links 

 Hendrik Pieter Koekkoek on ArtNet

1843 births
1927 deaths
People from Hilversum
19th-century Dutch painters
Dutch male painters
20th-century Dutch painters
19th-century Dutch male artists
20th-century Dutch male artists